Jonatán Hajdu (born 28 June 1996) is a Hungarian sprint canoeist. He represented his country at the 2016 Summer Olympics.

References

External links

1996 births
Living people
Hungarian male canoeists
Canoeists at the 2016 Summer Olympics
Olympic canoeists of Hungary
ICF Canoe Sprint World Championships medalists in Canadian
Canoeists from Budapest
Canoeists at the 2019 European Games
European Games competitors for Hungary
21st-century Hungarian people